Vittorio Di Prima (July 19, 1941 – February 9, 2016) was an Italian actor and voice actor.

Biography
Born in Palermo, Di Prima began his career as an actor at some point during the early 1970s. He has acted in two films and appeared in several television shows but he was more known to the Italian public as a voice dubbing artist. He  dubbed over the voices of Anthony Quinn, Leonard Nimoy, Morgan Freeman, Philippe Noiret, Carl Weathers, Jerry Stiller and Delroy Lindo in most of or some of their movies.

In animation, Di Prima provided the Italian voice of Henry J. Waternoose in Monsters, Inc., Sheriff in Cars and he also dubbed Animal in The Muppets and Muppets Most Wanted until he was replaced by Paolo Marchese in 2015.

Personal life
Di Prima was married to Ada Maria Serra Zanetti, who is also a voice actress.

Death
Di Prima died in Rome on February 9, 2016, at the age of 74.

Dubbing roles

Animation
Henry J. Waternoose III in Monsters, Inc.
Sheriff in Cars
Animal in The Muppets
Animal in Muppets Most Wanted
Sam the Eagle in The Muppet Show
Sneezy / The Huntsman in Snow White and the Seven Dwarfs (1972 redub)
Hugo in Barbie as Rapunzel
Erasmus in Barbie of Swan Lake
Ted Bedderhead in The Country Bears

Live action
Azeem Edin Bashir Al Bakir in Robin Hood: Prince of Thieves
God in Evan Almighty
Jack Doyle in Gone Baby Gone
Frank Carden in The Contract
Joe Matheson in Red
Spock in Star Trek: The Motion Picture
Spock in Star Trek II: The Wrath of Khan
Spock in Star Trek IV: The Voyage Home
Deaf Smith in Deaf Smith & Johnny Ears
Angelo Allieghieri in Avenging Angelo
Maury Ballstein in Zoolander
Apollo Creed in Rocky II
Apollo Creed in Rocky III
Dr. Richard Thorndyke in High Anxiety
Rufus in Kill Bill: Volume 2
Julius Levinson in Independence Day
Zeus in Hercules: The Legendary Journeys
Leonard Dillon in Alien 3
Salvatore Fiore in The Wedding Planner
John Seward in Dracula: Dead and Loving It
Grandpa George in Charlie and the Chocolate Factory
Matt "Guitar" Murphy in The Blues Brothers
Bo Catlett in Get Shorty
Vito Graziosi in Mickey Blue Eyes
Marion "Mr. Sir" Sevillo in Holes
Lonnie Hawkins in Ransom
Max in The Score

References

External links

1941 births
2016 deaths
Italian male film actors
Italian male television actors
Italian male voice actors
Male actors from Palermo
Italian voice directors
20th-century Italian male actors
21st-century Italian male actors